The Certainty of Man is a 1914 American silent short drama film starring Charlotte Burton, Sydney Ayres, Charles Morrison, Jack Richardson, Vivian Rich and Harry von Meter.

Cast
 Sydney Ayres as Fred, a cock-sure deputy sheriff
 Charles Morrison as Davis, the Sheriff
 Jack Richardson as Allen, the Geologist
 Harry von Meter as Pennington the postmaster
 Vivian Rich as Lucille, Pennington's ward
 Charlotte Burton as Mary, Lucille's mother

External links

1914 drama films
1914 films
Silent American drama films
American silent short films
American black-and-white films
1914 short films
Films directed by Lorimer Johnston
1910s American films